The EW Group is a German multinational family-owned livestock breeding group. It is the world market leader in breeding and genetics of poultry and tilapia. It comprises 53 German and 220 foreign companies under the parent company EW Group GmbH with headquarters in Visbek. Founder and manager of the group is Erich Wesjohann.

In 2020/2021, EW Group generated €3.182 billion revenue. Approximately 80% of its revenue generated from animal breeding. The group serves customers in more than 160 countries. 39.55% of sales were generated in Europe, 29.18% in North America, 11.12% in Asia, and 20.14% in the rest of the world.

History
In 1999 Erich Wesjohann established the EW Group after he and his brother Paul-Heinz Wesjohann split up the Lohmann-Wesjohann-Group they had jointly lead until then. In turn, Paul-Heinz Wesjohann established the PHW Group, which evolved into one of the largest poultry farming company in Europe. The common predecessor Lohmann-Wesjohann-Group dates back to 1932 when Paul Wesjohann, their father, founded an agricultural trade business with a hatchery in Rechterfeld and the same year but independently Heinz Lohmann founded a fishmeal factory in Cuxhaven which they later merged.

Initially, the EW Group focused on laying hen genetics, its subsidiary Lohmann Tierzucht being the world market leader for laying hen breeding. Since 2005, the EW Group expanded also into broiler genetics and bought the world market leader for broiler breeding Aviagen. In 2015, the EW Group became shareholder of the Plukon Food Group, one of the largest poultry farming companies in Europe. 
Subsequently, the EW Group acquired the broiler breeder Hubbard from Groupe Grimaud in 2018 and the French laying hen breeder Novogen as well as its Dutch distributor Verbeek in 2021.

Since 2008, the EW Group acquired multiple fish breeding and genetics companies: AquaGen (salmon and trout) in 2008, GenoMar (tilapia) in 2017 and AquaAmerica (tilapia) in 2020.

Animal Breeding

Laying hens
The laying hen division comprises four independent subsidiaries Lohmann Breeders (Germany, Lohmann Brown), Hy-Line International (United States), H&N International (Germany) and Novogen (France). Of the well over 7 billion laying hens kept worldwide, in 2019 approximately 2-3 billion laying hens came from EW Group breeding programmes.

Meat poultry
The subgroup Aviagen is the world's leading supplier of breeding stock for broiler and turkeys. Important broiler breeds are Ross, Arbor Acres, Indian River and Rowan Range. Especially the breed Ross is one of the globally predominant breeds, with many tens of billions of chicken distributed over the last decade. In addition, there are further breeding programs operated by the subsidiary Hubbard. Important turkey breeds are Nicholas Turkeys, Hockenhull Turkeys and B.U.T.

Fish
As a supplier for fish farming and aquaculture, the EW Group operates through the following subsidiaries: Norwegian-based AquaGen specialized in salmon and trout, Norwegian-based GenoMar specialized in tilapia, and Brazil-based AquaAmerica also specialized in tilapia.

Criticism

Animal welfare organizations criticize that the breed Ross is so fast-growing that their hearts and bone structures are compromised, leading to a higher mortality, lameness and muscle disease.

The subsidiary Lohmann Tierzucht (since 2020 named Lohmann Breeders) was legally convicted of animal cruelty in 2011.

References

External links

Meat companies of Germany
Poultry companies
Animal food manufacturers
Companies based in Lower Saxony
Food and drink companies established in 1999
Family businesses of Germany
German companies established in 1999
Vechta (district)